Antoni Milina (Bulgarian: Антони Милина; born 20 December 1989 in Croatia) is a Croatian footballer who last played for BŠK Zmaj in his home country.

Career
Milina started his senior career with R.E. Mouscron. In 2018, he signed for PFC Lokomotiv Plovdiv in the Bulgarian First Professional Football League, where he made ten league appearances and scored zero goals. After that, he played for BŠK Zmaj.

Personal life
Milina is younger brother of former goalkeeper Jure Milina

References

External links
 FROM THE BULGARIAN FIRST LEAGUE ARRIVED ON KORCULA / Goalkeeper who scores all over the field: 'Well, in the third league the average is 60,000 kuna for 10 months, it is more profitable than working somewhere'

1989 births
Living people
Association football goalkeepers
Croatian footballers
NK Imotski players
NK Lučko players
NK Hrvace players
PFC Lokomotiv Plovdiv players
First Football League (Croatia) players
First Professional Football League (Bulgaria) players
Croatian expatriate footballers
Expatriate footballers in Belgium
Croatian expatriate sportspeople in Belgium
Expatriate footballers in Spain
Croatian expatriate sportspeople in Spain
Expatriate footballers in Bulgaria
Croatian expatriate sportspeople in Bulgaria